The song "Polkaholik" constituted Atomik Harmonik's attempt to join the Eurovision Song Contest 2006 in Greece on January 29. It finished in 3rd place in the Slovenian national final (EMA).

Track listing
 Polkaholik  (2:57)
 Polkaholik (remix by DJ Rumek)  (2:55)
 Polkaholik (apre ski mix)  (2:57)
 Polkaholik (karaoke)  (2:57)
 Polkaholik Dance (video)

2006 singles
Atomik Harmonik songs